Events in the year 1983 in Greece.

Incumbents
President – Konstantinos Karamanlis
Prime Minister of Greece – Andreas Papandreou

Births

 11 March – Eirini Aindili, rhythmic gymnast
 27 September – Evangelia Christodoulou, rhythmic gymnast
 8 October – Anna Pollatou, rhythmic gymnast (died 2014)

References

 
Years of the 20th century in Greece
Greece
1980s in Greece
Greece